Suspect is a British crime drama television series. Adapted by Matt Baker, it is based on the Danish series Face to Face, which was created by Christoffer Boe. Suspect premiered on 19 June 2022 on Channel 4.

Premise
A detective retraces the final days of his murdered daughter to discover what happened.

Cast
 James Nesbitt as Danny Frater

 Sacha Dhawan as Jaisal
 Anne-Marie Duff as Susannah
 Sam Heughan as Ryan
 Niamh Algar as Nicola
 Richard E. Grant as Harry
 Ben Miller as Richard
 Antonia Thomas as Maia
 Joely Richardson as Jackie Sowden

 Imogen King as Christina

Production
The series was commissioned by Channel 4 in September 2021. Filming for the series began the following month, and generated slight controversy as customers were turned away while filming was undertaken at a Texaco in Vauxhall during the fuel crisis.

Episodes

References

External links

2022 British television series debuts
2020s British crime drama television series
British television series based on non-British television series
Channel 4 television dramas
English-language television shows
Television series by Fremantle (company)